A dentist is a practitioner of dentistry—a branch of medicine pertaining to the oral cavity.

Dentist may also refer to:
 The Dentists, a British band active in the 1980s and 1990s
 The Dentist, a 1996 horror film
 The Dentist 2, a 1998 sequel to the aforementioned film
 The Dentist (1932 film), a comedic short starring W. C. Fields
 "Dentist" (Adventure Time), an episode of an animated series
 Dentist (band), an American rock band
 Dentist (album)